The International Research & Exchanges Board (IREX) is an international, nonprofit organization that specializes in global education and development. IREX works with partners in more than 100 countries.

History 
IREX was established in 1968 by the American Council of Learned Societies, the Ford Foundation, the Social Science Research Council, and the US Department of State. IREX conducted scholarly exchanges between the US and the Soviet Union until the fall of the Iron Curtain.

After the collapse of the Soviet Union, IREX implemented projects to support democratic reforms and strengthen organizations. IREX administered programs to conduct educational exchanges, strengthen civil society in developing countries, increase internet access, and provide training and support to journalists and media organizations.

Activities 
IREX designs and implements programs that focus on civil society, education, gender, governance, leadership, media, technology, and youth.

These programs include the Mandela Washington Fellowship for Young African Leaders, the World Smarts STEM Challenge, and Learn to Discern, which has been discussed for its approach to helping citizens recognize disinformation and fake news.

See also
 Human development
 International education
 Leadership development
 Media development
 Media literacy
 Positive youth development
 Soft power

References

External links
Official website

Non-profit organizations based in Washington, D.C.
Academic transfer
Educational organizations based in the United States